Joanna Kachilika (born 8 June 1984) is a Malawian netball player and captain of the Malawi national team who plays in the positions of goal defense or wing defense. She has featured in two World Cup tournaments for Malawi in 2011 and in 2019. She has also competed at the Commonwealth Games on three successive occasions in 2010, 2014 and in 2018 representing Malawi.

In September 2019, she was included in the Malawian squad to lead the team for the 2019 African Netball Championships.

References 

1984 births
Living people
Malawian netball players
Netball players at the 2010 Commonwealth Games
Netball players at the 2014 Commonwealth Games
Netball players at the 2018 Commonwealth Games
Commonwealth Games competitors for Malawi
2019 Netball World Cup players